Sheridan Ming (born 3 August 1965) is a former Bermudian cricketer. Ming was a right-handed batsman who bowled right-arm medium-slow.

Ming made a single List A appearance for Bermuda against the Windward Islands at Ronald Webster Park in the 2000/01 Red Stripe Bowl. The Windward Islands batted first, making 252/5 from their fifty overs. Bermuda were dismissed for 147 in their innings to lose the match by 105 runs, with Ming being dismissed for a duck by Roy Marshall.

References

External links
Sheridan Ming at ESPNcricinfo
Sheridan Ming at CricketArchive

1965 births
Living people
Bermudian cricketers